Notobryon bijecurum is a species of sea slug, a nudibranch, a marine gastropod mollusk in the family Scyllaeidae.

References

 Pola M., Camacho-Garcia Y.E. & Gosliner T.M. (2012) Molecular data illuminate cryptic nudibranch species: the evolution of the Scyllaeidae (Nudibranchia: Dendronotina) with a revision of Notobryon. Zoological Journal of the Linnean Society 165: 311–336

Scyllaeidae
Gastropods described in 1937